"The Jacksons" is the name, since 1976, of the American family singing group formerly known as The Jackson 5.

"The Jacksons" may also refer to:
 Jackson family, the entire family which includes the singing group
 The Jacksons (album), a 1976 album by the group
 The Jacksons (TV series), a 1976-1977 TV variety show starring most of the family
 The Jacksons: An American Dream, a 1992 miniseries about the family
 The Jacksons: A Family Dynasty, a 2009-2010 reality TV series starring the family
 The Jacksons: Next Generation, a 2015 reality TV series starring the members of the musical group 3T, part of the same family

See also
 Jackson's (disambiguation)
 Jackson (disambiguation)